The enzyme fructose-6-phosphate phosphoketolase catalyzes the chemical reaction

D-fructose 6-phosphate + phosphate  acetyl phosphate + D-erythrose 4-phosphate + H2O

This enzyme belongs to the family of lyases, specifically the aldehyde-lyases, which cleave carbon-carbon bonds.  The systematic name of this enzyme class is D-fructose-6-phosphate D-erythrose-4-phosphate-lyase (adding phosphate; acetyl-phosphate-forming). Other names in common use include D-fructose-6-phosphate D-erythrose-4-phosphate-lyase, and (phosphate-acetylating).  This enzyme participates in pentose phosphate pathway.

References

 

EC 4.1.2
Enzymes of unknown structure